The Ministry of Agriculture and Fisheries (MAF;) is the government department of East Timor accountable for agriculture, fisheries, and related matters.

Functions
The Ministry is responsible for the design, implementation, coordination and evaluation of policy for the following areas:

 agriculture;
 forests;
 fisheries; and
 livestock.

Minister
The incumbent Minister of Agriculture and Fisheries is Pedro dos Reis. He is assisted by Abílio Xavier de Araújo, Deputy Minister of Agriculture and Fisheries, and Elídio de Araújo, Secretary of State for Fisheries.

See also 
 List of agriculture ministries
 Politics of East Timor

References

Footnote

Notes

External links

  – official site  

Agriculture and Fisheries
East Timor
East Timor
East Timor, Agriculture and Fisheries
2001 establishments in East Timor